High Tension (French: Haute Tension, ; released in the United Kingdom as Switchblade Romance) is a 2003 French slasher film directed by Alexandre Aja, co-written with Grégory Levasseur, and starring Cécile de France and Maïwenn, alongside Philippe Nahon appeared in supporting roles. Its plot follows two female students who arrive at a secluded farmhouse to study, where they are shortly invaded by a serial killer.

Associated with the New French Extremity movement, High Tension was picked up by Lions Gate Entertainment following a successful screening at the Midnight Madness section of the 2003 Toronto International Film Festival, where it was re-dubbed in English and re-edited to secure an R rating. Lions Gate then spent $14 million to open the film in wide release in the United States, where it eventually only grossed $3.6 million; Lions Gate later released the original cut on Blu-ray and DVD.

All of the effects were created by Italian horror make-up artist Giannetto De Rossi, a favorite of late director Lucio Fulci.

Plot
Marie and Alex are best friends on their way to stay at Alex's parent's house for the weekend to study. When they arrive, Alex gives Marie a tour of her house before they settle down for dinner. After dinner, Marie and Alex get ready to go to bed. As Alex sleeps, Marie lies on her bed listening to music and masturbating. Marie hears a doorbell ring and Alex's father Daniel wakes to answer it. The man at the door is a serial killer, who slashes Daniel's face with a straight razor. His head is pressed between two spindles of the staircase, and the killer shoves a bookcase towards his head, decapitating him. The noise awakens Alex's mother, who finds Daniel dead and is approached by the killer.

Marie, hearing the mother's screams, quickly arranges the guest room to make it appear that no one is staying there, and hides under her bed. The killer inspects Marie's room but does not find her. Marie creeps downstairs and finds Alex chained in her bedroom. Promising to find help, she sneaks into the parents' room to find a phone. After hearing loud thuds, she hides in the closet and through the slats of the door witnesses the killing of Alex's mother as her throat is brutally slashed with a razor.

Alex's younger brother Tom runs from the house to the cornfield, pursued by the killer. Marie returns to Alex, where she witnesses Tom's murder from a window. Marie promises to free Alex, but the killer is heard returning. Marie sneaks into the kitchen and takes a butcher knife. Alex is dragged into the killer's truck. Marie sneaks into the truck with the butcher knife and hides there with Alex. He locks them in and drives off.

When the killer stops at a gas station, Marie gives Alex the knife and sneaks into the gas station shop for help. When the killer comes into the shop, Marie hides and she witnesses the store clerk Jimmy being murdered with an axe. The killer returns to the truck and Marie calls the police but hangs up in frustration when she's unable to tell them where she is. She takes the clerk's keys and uses his car to follow the killer down a deserted road. The killer notices Marie following him, and rams Marie's vehicle, pushing the car off the road where it wrecks. Exiting on foot, badly injured, Marie runs into the forest as the killer seeks her. Eventually, Marie bludgeons the killer with a fence post covered in barbed wire. As Marie inspects the body, he grabs at her throat, so Marie suffocates him with a plastic sheet and makes her way back to the truck. Alex seems terrified of Marie as she returns to the vehicle. As police investigate the gas station murders via the in-store videotape, the tape shows Marie murdering the store clerk. In retrospect, it is revealed that Marie is murderous, delusional, and in love with Alex and the real killer of Alex's family.

At the truck, Marie unties Alex. As soon as Alex is free, she threatens Marie with the knife and accuses her of butchering her family. Alex slashes Marie's face and stabs her in the stomach before running into the forest. Marie chases Alex with a concrete saw. Alex finds a road and flags down a car. As Alex is climbing into the car, Marie appears brandishing the concrete saw and disembowels the driver. A stray piece of glass slices Alex's Achilles tendon. Alex takes a crowbar from the car's toolbox and crawls along the road. Marie forces Alex to tell her that she loves her, and she kisses her. While engaged in the kiss, Alex plunges the crowbar into Marie's upper-chest as Marie proclaims she'll never let anyone come between them.

Sometime later, Marie is in a psychiatric hospital room, with Alex watching her through a one-way mirror. Marie grins and reaches for Alex, evidently aware that she is behind it.

Cast

Main
 Cécile de France as Marie
 Maïwenn as Alexia Soral

Supporting
 Philippe Nahon as The Killer
 Andrei Finti as Daniel Soral, Alex's father
 Oana Pellea as Mrs. Soral, Alex's mother
 Franck Khalfoun as Jimmy
 Marco Claudiu Pascu as Tom Soral, Alex's little brother

Release
High Tension was released in France on 18 June 2003 where it was distributed by EuropaCorp.

The film was shown at the 2003 Toronto International Film Festival during the Midnight Madness section. After screening at the festival, the film was purchased by Lionsgate Films for North American distribution. In her book Films of the New French Extremity, Alexandra West described The screening of High Tension at Midnight Madness made that section of the film festival an "unintentional bastion for New French Extremity", which still did not have a popular following. Following High Tensions'''s release there, other films followed at the festival such as Calvaire (2004), Sheitan (2006) and Frontier(s) and Inside (2007) and Martyrs (2008).

In the United States, Lionsgate released an English-dubbed version of the film in 1323 theaters on 10 June 2005 (with $14 million marketing cost). Several murders scenes were truncated in order to avoid an NC-17 rating. A re-cut theatrical trailer was released by Lionsgate to promote the film, featuring "Superstar" by Sonic Youth.

Censorship
Some scenes were edited for the American version to achieve an R rating by the MPAA. About one minute of the film was cut in order to avoid the NC-17 rating. The R-rated edition was released in American cinemas, in a less widely circulated fullscreen DVD, and on the streaming service Tubi. This section notes what was deleted from the unrated, original French film to produce the American version.
 Alex's father is graphically decapitated with a bookcase, his headless neck spraying blood. In the R-rated version, the murder is edited to quickly cut away as the bookcase crushes and severs his head. Later the body is seen on the staircase without the head. 
 When Alex's mother has her throat slashed, the scene is shortened; most of the arterial spurting, as the killer pulls back her head, is gone. Subsequent shots of Marie inspecting the body have also been edited.
 The death of Jimmy the gas station clerk has been shortened. Close-up shots of the axe sticking in his chest have been removed.
 The scene where Marie strikes the killer's face with the barbed wire pole is shortened and less explicit; Marie hits the killer fewer times, and fewer details of the killer's wounds are shown.
 The driver's disembowelment with the concrete saw was shortened.
 A close-up of the crowbar in Marie's shoulder is missing.

Reception
According to the internet review aggregator Rotten Tomatoes, the film holds a 41% approval rating based on 133 reviews, with a weighted average of 5.30/10. The consensus states: "There is indeed a good amount of tension in this French slasher, but the dubbing is bad and the end twist unbelievable." It also received a score of 42 on Metacritic based on 30 critics, classifying it as having received "mixed or average reviews". Audiences polled by CinemaScore gave the film an average grade of "C−" on an A+ to F scale.

American film critic Roger Ebert awarded the film only one star, opening his review, "The philosopher Thomas Hobbes tells us life can be 'poor, nasty, brutish and short.' So is this movie." He added that the film had a plot hole "that is not only large enough to drive a truck through, but in fact does have a truck driven right through it."

Lisa Nesselson of Variety was more forgiving, saying that the film "deftly juggles gore and suspense", has "unnerving sound design", and "has a sinister, haemoglobin look that fits the story like a glove". James Berardinelli praised the film, writing: "The film revels in blood and gore, but this is not just a run-of-the-mill splatter film. There's a lot of intelligence in both the script and in Alexandre Aja's direction ... For those who enjoy horror films and don't mind copious quantities of red-dyed fluids, this one is not to be missed. It's a triumph of the Grand Guignol." The Village Voices Mark Holcomb wrote that the film resembles "a pastiche of '70s American slasher flicks that seemingly stands to add to the worldwide glut of irono-nostalgic sequels, remakes, and retreads," ultimately seeing it a "gratifyingly gory, doggedly intellectual decon of the likes of The Texas Chainsaw Massacre, Halloween and (surprisingly but aptly) Duel."

Controversy
The film was included in TIME Magazine's 10 most ridiculously violent films.

Several viewers of the film noticed striking similarities between the plot of the film and the plot of Dean Koontz's novel Intensity. When questioned at the Sundance Festival in 2004, the director acknowledged that he had read the novel and was aware of the similarities.  On his website, Koontz stated that he was aware of the comparison but would not sue "because he found the film so puerile, so disgusting, and so intellectually bankrupt that he didn’t want the association with it that would inevitably come if he pursued an action against the filmmaker."

Soundtrack
 Muse — "New Born"
 Ricchi e Poveri — "Sarà perché ti amo"
 U-Roy — "Runaway Girl"
 Félix Gray and Didier Barbelivien — "A toutes les filles"
 François Eudes-Chanfrault — "Faustina Mauricio Mercedes"
 Scott Nickoley, Jamie Dunlap, Molly Pasutti, and Marc Ferrari — "I Believe"
 François Eudes-Chanfrault — "Celebration A2"
 Arch Bacon — "Pillow Talk"
 François Eudes-Chanfrault — "Paris—Nice"
 François Eudes-Chanfrault — "Out of the Mundial"

Reference in other media
New York-based Horrorcore artist Corey Jennings aka Kardiac paid homage to High Tension in the music video to his single "The Country Road Cover Up".

See alsoIntensity, 1997 TV mini-series based on the 1995 novel by Dean Koontz that bears similarities to High Tension''
List of films featuring home invasions

References

Works cited

External links
 
 
 
 
 
 

2003 films
2003 horror films
2003 LGBT-related films
Censored films
Films about dissociative identity disorder
Films set on farms
EuropaCorp films
Lionsgate films
Fiction with unreliable narrators
Films directed by Alexandre Aja
French horror films
French independent films
2000s French-language films
French LGBT-related films
French serial killer films
French slasher films
French splatter films
Home invasions in film
LGBT-related controversies in film
LGBT-related horror films
New French Extremity films
Obscenity controversies in film
2000s French films